Lists of women Test cricketers are lists of women's Test cricket players by team.

 List of Australia women Test cricketers
 List of England women Test cricketers
 List of India women Test cricketers
 List of Ireland women Test cricketers
 List of Netherlands women Test cricketers
 List of New Zealand women Test cricketers
 List of Pakistan women Test cricketers
 List of South Africa women Test cricketers
 List of Sri Lanka women Test cricketers
 List of West Indies women Test cricketers

See also
 Lists of women One Day International cricketers
 Lists of women Twenty20 International cricketers